Thomas Kirk (1765–1797) was a noted English artist, book illustrator, and engraver of the late 18th century.

A pupil of Richard Cosway, Kirk exhibited the first of 25 works at the Royal Academy in 1785, and created many famous engravings based either upon his own work or works by, amongst others, Angelica Kauffman, Richard Westall, and Sir Joshua Reynolds.

Although he illustrated James Thomson's The Seasons in 1793, he was employed most consistently by Cooke for his editions of celebrated works of literature. Cooke's Pocket Edition of English Poets (1796-8) was especially popular, and Kirk's illustrations impressed many of his contemporaries. Edward Dayes said of him: 'He passed like a meteor through the region of art'.

Original drawings by him are rare, often in oval format, and owe much to the influence of Kauffman. The draughtsmanship is of the highest quality and some his pictures are described as 'ornamented' by R. W. Satchwell, who occasionally drew the surrounds.

His promising career was cut short by illness. Working to the end, he died in 1797 of consumption (i.e. tuberculosis), having exhibited his final works at the Royal Academy (Evening and A Dream) the previous year. His last known address was 8 Judd Place West, New Road (renamed Euston Road in 1857), London.

References

Book Illustrators in 18th Century England by H. Hammelmann (Yale University Press, 1975)
A Century of British Painters by Samuel and Richard Redgrave (Phaidon Press)

1765 births
1797 deaths
English engravers
18th-century English painters
English male painters
18th-century deaths from tuberculosis
Tuberculosis deaths in England
18th-century English male artists